Pskov was a Project 11351 Nerey-class frigate (NATO reporting name Krivak III) of the Coast Guard of the Federal Security Service of Russia. Previously the ship served in the KGB Border Troops Naval Service as Imeni 70-letiya VChK-KGB (Имени 70-летия ВЧК-КГБ).

Design and description
Pskov was one of nine Project 11351 ships launched between 1982 and 1992. Project 11351, the Nerey ("Nereus") class, was the patrol version of the Project 1135 Burevestnik for the Soviet Maritime Border Troops. The ships were designated Border Guard Ship (PSKR) to reflect their role as patrol ships of the Border Troops. In comparison to other members of the class, Project 11351 ships has a helipad and hangar for a Kamov Ka-27PS search-and-rescue helicopter astern, in exchange to losing one 100 mm gun, one twin-arm surface-to-air missile launcher and the URPK-5 Rastrub (SS-N-14 'Silex') anti-ship missile launchers. NATO classified the vessels as 'Krivak III'-class frigates.

Displacing  standard and  full load, the ship's power were provided by two  DT59 and two  DS71 gas turbines arranged in a COGAG installation, driving two fixed-pitch propellers. The ship's complement was 192, including 31 officers.

Armament and sensors
Pskov was armed with one  AK-100 gun mounted forward of the bridge and two AK-630M close-in weapon system autocannons mounted on each side of the helicopter hangar. Defence against aircraft was provided by twenty 4K33 OSA-M (SA-N-4 'Gecko') surface-to-air missiles which were launched from one set of twin-arm ZIF-122 launchers, mounted aft of the fore 100 mm gun. For anti-submarine warfare, the ship were equipped with a pair of RBU-6000  Smerch-2 12-barrel anti-submarine rocket launchers and a pair of PTA-53-1135 quadruple launchers for  torpedoes, consisted of either 53-65K wake homing torpedo or SET-65 anti-submarine homing torpedo. The ship can also carry 16 naval mines.

The ship sensor suites includes Sapfir-U7 combat management system, a single MR-760 Fregat-MA air/surface search radar, one Vaigach-Nayada navigation radar, and the MP-401 Start Electronic Support Measures (ESM) system. Fire control for the guns consisted of MR-184 Lev radar for the 100 mm gun and Vympel-A radar for the 30 mm autocannons. An extensive sonar complex was fitted, including the bow-mounted MGK-335S Platina-S and the towed-array MG-345 Bronza. The vessel was also equipped with two PK-16 and two PK-10 decoy-dispenser system which used chaff as a form of missile defense.

Construction and career
The frigate was the fourth ship of the class. The keel was laid in 1984 with yard number 204 at the Zaliv Shipyard in Kerch. The ship was launched in 1987. The frigate was commissioned on 29 December 1987 as Imeni 70-letiya VChK-KGB.

The ship was assigned to the 2nd Brigade of Border Guard Ships, 1st Red Banner Division of Border Guard Ships in Petropavlovsk-Kamchatsky, part of the Northeastern Border District. In mid 1988, Imeni 70-letiya VChK-KGB sailed from Sevastopol to its assigned homeport in Petropavlovsk-Kamchatsky via Suez Canal.

Upon the dissolution of the Soviet Union in December 1991, the ship was retained by Russia and the Maritime Border Forces of the Russian Federation inherited it. The frigate was renamed to Pskov on 1 December 1993.

She was decommissioned on 24 April 2002. Pskov was stricken from the coast guard on 28 February 2003 and was sent to China for scrapping, although according to Jane's Fighting Ships 2015-2016, the ship was extant and non-operational as of 2015.

References

Citations

Bibliography

External links

Project 11351 border guard ship "Named after the 70th anniversary of the Cheka-KGB" Gallery

1987 ships
Cold War frigates of the Soviet Union
Krivak-class frigates
Krivak-class frigates of the Border Guard Service of Russia
Ships built at the Zalyv Shipbuilding yard
Ships built in the Soviet Union